The Canadian Automobile Association (CAA) is a federation of eight regional not-for-profit automobile associations in Canada, founded in 1913. The constituent associations (also called "clubs") are responsible for providing roadside assistance, auto touring and leisure travel services, insurance services, and member discount programs within their service territories. The CAA National Office in Ottawa coordinates relations between the clubs, oversees joint initiatives, and lobbies the federal government. In 2020 and 2021, the Gustavson Brand Trust Index named CAA the most trusted brand in Canada.

CAA is not affiliated with the London-based Dominion Automobile Association (c. 1948) or consumer groups such as the Automobile Protection Agency.

Lobbying
The CAA considers itself to be an advocate for Canada's motorists and travellers. CAA is an active political lobby for Canadian consumers, pursuing the interests of drivers and travellers in public consultations over urban planning and public transit. CAA lobbied to put in place stronger consumer protection laws for air passengers. CAA commented in Support of Bill C-49 before the House Standing Committee on Transport, Infrastructure and Communities in 2017.

Clubs

, CAA consists of eight clubs.

Alberta Motor Association (AMA) 
The Alberta Motor Association (AMA) is a non-profit membership organization serving Alberta and the Northwest Territories. The organization was founded in 1926 with 1400 members; original dues were $6.50.

It is headquartered in Edmonton and is affiliated with the Canadian Automobile Association (CAA) and the American Automobile Association (AAA) and has more than 980,000 members as of November 2021. The Alberta Motor Association provides its members with roadside assistance service, a range of auto touring and leisure travel services, insurance services, and member discounts with partners. AMA Financial has also begun offering a variety of mortgage and Guaranteed Investment Certificate products to members.

The Association is one of the largest CAA/AAA affiliates in North America. AMA operates Western Canada’s largest travel agency, AMA Travel. AMA publishes its member's Magazine AMA Insider from its Edmonton Headquarters. The association also owns Bridgewater Bank, a Calgary-based chartered bank.

On August 8, 2016, the AMA announced that an executive was dismissed for cause related to "fraudulent activity".  The Canadian Broadcasting Corporation reported the AMA had commenced a lawsuit against the former vice-president of information technology seeking recovery of $8.2 million CAD related to fraudulent invoices.

CAA Manitoba 
CAA Manitoba can trace its origins to the creation of the Winnipeg Auto Club in 1904, the first club of its kind in Canada. The organization later evolved into the Manitoba Motor League, becoming an integral part of motoring history in the province – from developing the first road map, to marking highways, to implementing road safety programs. The MML was renamed CAA Manitoba in 1993. Today CAA Manitoba represents more than 190,000 members and has expanded beyond  emergency road service to include a full service travel agency, home and property insurance and travel products. CAA Manitoba is actively engaged in advocacy issues, most recently with its 'Move Over Manitoba' campaign to convince the provincial government to extend to tow truck operators the same protective measures that cover emergency roadside personnel.

CAA Saskatchewan 
CAA Saskatchewan is a non-profit membership organization serving Saskatchewan affiliated with the Canadian Automobile Association (CAA) and the AAA (formerly American Automobile Association). The organization's headquarters are located in Regina, Saskatchewan, and it has over 184,000 members as of May 2010 and provides them with roadside assistance service, a range of auto touring and leisure travel services, insurance services, vehicle repair and sales services, and member discounts with preferred companies. CAA Saskatchewan is also an advocate for motoring and related consumer issues and a supplier of automotive and other travel services.

CAA Saskatchewan, formerly the Saskatchewan Motor League, has been in operation since 1917 and was organized by Frederick E. Betts. The association includes automotive sales and service facilities, a travel agency and an insurance agency. Besides providing a full range of travel services and packages, CAA Saskatchewan also owns and operates its own motorcoach company, WestWorld Tours, which offers fully escorted tours to a variety of North American destinations. CAA Saskatchewan's insurance agency offers a wide range of insurance products, from basic coverage to all-risk comprehensive policies, for home and property, auto, health & dental, travel and life insurance, with added benefits and savings for CAA Saskatchewan Members. The Show Your Card & Save program also provides Members savings at thousands of attractions, retailers and merchants throughout the world, with point-of-sale discounts and the opportunity to earn CAA Dollars which can be redeemed on CAA merchandise and services.

CAA Club Group (CCG) 

CAA Club Group, formed by the merger of CAA South Central Ontario with CAA Manitoba, is an affiliated club of the Canadian Automobile Association (CAA) in the Canadian provinces and territories of Manitoba, Nunavut, and parts of Ontario. It is a not for profit organization with its head offices located in Thornhill, Ontario and Winnipeg, Manitoba. CAA Club Group primarily provides roadside assistance, auto, property & travel insurance services, as well as leisure travel services to its members.The Toronto Automobile Club was founded on May 4, 1903. By this time like-minded motorists were forming their own clubs throughout Ontario to exchange and share information about their vehicles.  In 1907 the Toronto Automobile Club and clubs representing Hamilton, Ottawa and Kingston formed the Ontario Motor League (OML) with the purpose of helping automobile owners to lobby governments, as opposition to the automobile was extensive at the time.  It had a paid membership from the various clubs of 170 active, and 56 associate, individual members.

In Ontario, the CAA was formerly the 'Ontario Motor League'. It facilitates Ontario's Drive Clean program from the CAA locations that double as Ministry of Transport licence renewal and vehicle registration offices. The Ontario Motor League originally was not affiliated with the CAA or AAA.

The OML set up various committees such as the Legislative and Good Roads Committee and also started a Touring Bureau which informed members where they could drive without getting mired in mud, and which hotels would provide gas and water.  New automobile clubs sprang up across Ontario, amalgamating in time with others, but still using the OML as a unifying organization to represent motorists to the government of Ontario.  Over time, the names of both the individual clubs and the OML changed.  By 1996, the old Toronto Automobile Club was known as CAA Central Ontario, and the OML as CAA Ontario which still exists as a formal organization to help represent the remaining clubs to the Government of Ontario.

In 2005, after mergers with CAA Eastern Ontario, CAA Peterborough, CAA Windsor, CAA Mid-western Ontario and the former CAA South Central Ontario (Hamilton and region), CAA Central Ontario took the name CAA South Central Ontario.  It has over 2 million members and covers the entire province except for the Niagara Region (CAA Niagara) and the far north and eastern (including Ottawa) regions of the province (CAA North and East Ontario).

CAA South Central Ontario covers the City of Toronto, and the following areas in Ontario: Districts of Algoma and Muskoka, Counties of Bruce, Dufferin, Elgin, Essex, Frontenac, Grey, Haliburton, Hastings, Huron, Lambton, Leeds and Grenville, Lennox and Addington, Middlesex, Northumberland, Oxford, Perth, Peterborough, Prince Edward, Simcoe, Wellington and  City of Kawartha Lakes, Regional Municipalities of Brant County, Chatham-Kent, Durham, Haldimand-Norfolk, Halton, Hamilton-Wentworth, Peel, Waterloo and York.

See also
American Automobile Association
AA Limited – the British motoring association
Evo Car Share – a carsharing service created by BCAA
Fédération Internationale de l'Automobile

References

External links
CAA National

 
1913 establishments in Canada
Non-profit organizations based in Ottawa
Lobbying organizations in Canada
Organizations established in 1913
Emergency road services